Alan Spavin (20 February 1942 – 16 March 2016) was an English footballer. A product of Preston North End's youth system, he featured in over 400 league games for the side.

He moved to the United States in May 1974 to play for Washington Diplomats. He then joined Morecambe in August 1975, followed by a spell with Dundalk from February to April 1976 where he helped them win the League of Ireland Championship.

Honours
Preston North End
 FA Youth Cup runners-up: 1959-60
 FA Cup runners-up: 1963-64
 Football League Third Division champions: 1970-71

Dundalk
 League of Ireland: 1975–76

References

1942 births
2016 deaths
Sportspeople from Lancaster, Lancashire
English footballers
Association football inside forwards
Preston North End F.C. players
Washington Diplomats (NASL) players
Morecambe F.C. players
Dundalk F.C. players
English Football League players
North American Soccer League (1968–1984) players
League of Ireland players
English expatriate footballers
Expatriate soccer players in the United States
English expatriate sportspeople in the United States
FA Cup Final players